Robert Taube (1880–1961) was a Russian-born German stage and film actor.

Selected filmography
 I.N.R.I. (1923)
 Carlos and Elisabeth (1924)
 The Woman Who Did (1925)
 Das leichte Mädchen (1941)
 Andreas Schlüter (1942)
 The Blue Swords (1949)

Bibliography
 Eisner, Lotte H. The Haunted Screen: Expressionism in the German Cinema and the Influence of Max Reinhardt. University of California Press, 2008.

External links

1880 births
1961 deaths
German male film actors
German male stage actors
German male silent film actors
Actors from Riga
Baltic-German people
20th-century German male actors
Emigrants from the Russian Empire to Germany